Poteet is a city in Atascosa County, Texas, United States. The population was 3,260 as of the 2010 census. It is part of the San Antonio Metropolitan Statistical Area. It was named for its first postmaster, Francis Marion Poteet. It is best known as the birthplace of country music legend, George Strait.

Poteet is known for its "". Poteet Canyon, Steve Canyon's ward in the long-running comic strip by Milton Caniff, is named after the town (and a mosaic of Poteet Canyon stands in front of the town's fire station). In James Michener's classic, Centennial, cattleman R. J. Poteet led the drive of a large herd of Texas Longhorns north from Texas to Colorado.

Geography

Education
Poteet is served by the Poteet Independent School District, including Poteet High School.

Demographics

2020 census

As of the 2020 United States census, there were 2,795 people, 1,084 households, and 855 families residing in the city.

2000 census
As of the census of 2000, 3,305 people, 1,052 households, and 810 families resided in the city. The population density was 2,224.2 people per square mile (856.4/km). The 1,201 housing units averaged 808.2/sq mi (311.2/km). The racial makeup of the city was 64.99% White, 0.36% African American, 0.27% Native American, 30.11% from other races, and 4.27% from two or more races. Hispanics or Latinos of any race were 88.84% of the population.

Of the 1,052 households, 44.3% had children under the age of 18 living with them, 47.1% were married couples living together, 23.7% had a female householder with no husband present, and 23.0% were not families. About 21.0% of all households were made up of individuals, and 11.8% had someone living alone who was 65 years of age or older. The average household size was 3.11 and the average family size was 3.60.

In the city, the population was distributed as 34.6% under the age of 18, 10.2% from 18 to 24, 25.6% from 25 to 44, 17.7% from 45 to 64, and 12.0% who were 65 years of age or older. The median age was 29 years. For every 100 females, there were 90.8 males. For every 100 females age 18 and over, there were 83.5 males.

The median income for a household in the city was $25,329, and for a family was $27,949. Males had a median income of $23,929 versus $15,608 for females. The per capita income for the city was $9,368. About 23.6% of families and 28.0% of the population were below the poverty line, including 33.1% of those under age 18 and 29.7% of those age 65 or over.

Notable people

 David Lee Garza, Tejano music artist, was born in Poteet
 George Strait, country music singer, actor, producer, and most CMA and ACM award winner, known as the "King of Country Music", was born in Poteet

References

External links
 Poteet article at Texas State Historical Association

Cities in Atascosa County, Texas
Cities in Texas
Greater San Antonio